Jan Wiley (February 21, 1916 – May 26, 1993) was an American film actress.

Early years 
Wiley was born Jan Harriet Wiley in Marion, Indiana and early in her career was billed as Harriet Brandon.

Film 
Beginning in 1937 with New Faces of 1937 and Stage Door, Wiley appeared in 39 films in a mixture of lead, supporting and minor roles in Hollywood B Movies. She had a rare leading role as the title character in A Fig Leaf for Eve (1944) but is probably best remembered for the 1946 horror film She-Wolf of London.

Personal life 
Wiley was married to actor Roger Wister Clark; they were divorced July 19, 1945. She retired from acting after marrying Mort Green in 1947. They had two children and were divorced in 1971.

Death 
On May 27, 1993, Wiley died of cancer at a retirement home in Rancho Palos Verdes, California. She was 77. Her body was cremated, and her ashes were scattered at sea off San Pedro, California.

Selected filmography
 

 New Faces of 1937 (1937) - Showgirl
 Stage Door (1937) - Madeline
 Kitty Foyle (1940) - Miss Bala - Office Worker (uncredited)
 Citizen Kane (1941) - Reporter at Xanadu (uncredited)
 Tonto Basin Outlaws (1941) - Jane Blanchard
 Zis Boom Bah (1941) - Annabella
 Dick Tracy vs. Crime Inc. (1941) - June 'Eve' Chandler
 Thunder River Feud (1942) - Maybelle Pembroke
 The Strange Case of Doctor Rx (1942) - Lily (uncredited)
 You're Telling Me (1942) - Girl Announcer (uncredited)
 Almost Married (1942) - Louella Marvin
 Top Sergeant (1942) - Army Press Photographer (uncredited)
 Parachute Nurse (1942) - Tenderfoot (uncredited)
 City of Silent Men (1942) - Jane Muller
 Criminal Investigator (1942) - Harriet Drake
 The Living Ghost (1942) - Tina Craig
 Rhythm Parade (1942) - Connie
 Dawn on the Great Divide (1942) - Martha Corkle (uncredited)
 Gals, Incorporated (1943) - Showgirl (uncredited)
 Fired Wife (1943) - Leading Lady (uncredited)
 So Proudly We Hail! (1943) - Lt. Lynne Hopkins (uncredited)
 The Underdog (1943) - Ämy Tate
 Never a Dull Moment (1943) - Checkroom Girl (uncredited)
 Jive Junction (1943) - Miss Forbes
 Law Men (1944) - Phyliss
 Follow the Boys (1944) - Phone Operator (uncredited)
 San Diego, I Love You (1944) - Receptionist (uncredited)
 A Fig Leaf for Eve (1944) - Eve Lorraine / Eve Westland
 Adventures of Kitty O'Day (1945) - Carla Brant
 There Goes Kelly (1945) - Rita Wilson aka Gladys Wharton
 The Cisco Kid Returns (1945) - Jeanette
 The Master Key (1945) - Janet Lowe
 Secret Agent X-9 (1945) - Lynn Moore
 Frontier Gal (1945) - Sheila Winthop
 I Ring Doorbells (1946) - Helen Carter
 She-Wolf of London (1946) - Carol Winthrop
 Below the Deadline (1946) - Vivian Saunders
 The Brute Man (1946) - Virginia Rogers Scott
 The Best Years of Our Lives (1946) - Perfume Saleswoman (uncredited) (final film role)

References

Bibliography
 Tom Weaver, Michael Brunas & John Brunas. Universal Horrors: The Studio's Classic Films, 1931-1946. McFarland, 1990.

External links

1916 births
1993 deaths
American film actresses
20th-century American actresses